Luigi Scrosati (1814 in Milan – 1869 in Milan) was an Italian painter.

He was not trained in any of the academies, nor did he apprentice with a master painter. He however gained respect as a watercolor painter, and was supported by his friend Giuseppe Bertini. He painted frescoes for the palaces of Palazzo Litta, Palazzo Poldi-Pezzoli, Palazzo Serbelloni, and Villa Ghirlanda in Cinisello Balsamo. He worked in these with Bertini and Francesco Podesti. Late in life, he painted still lifes with flowers, and was professor of practical decoration at the Brera Academy. Among his pupils was Ermocrate Bucchi.

Sources

1814 births
1869 deaths
19th-century Italian painters
Italian male painters
Painters from Milan
Italian still life painters
Fresco painters
19th-century Italian male artists